The Cleveland Rebels were a basketball team in the Basketball Association of America (BAA), a forerunner of the modern National Basketball Association (NBA), based in Cleveland.

Franchise history
The Rebels were an inaugural franchise in the BAA's first season. In their only season, the team went 30–30, finishing 3rd in the Western Division and losing in the first round of the playoffs, two games to one to the New York Knickerbockers, in its only season before going out of business.  The Rebels included notable early pro stars Big Ed Sadowski and Kenny Sailors. Cleveland would not have another team in what would become the NBA until the Cavaliers joined the league in 1970.

|-
!colspan=6| Cleveland Rebels (BAA)
|-
|1946–47 || 30 || 30 || .500 || Lost First Round || New York 2, Cleveland 1
|-

All-time roster
The following players are the all-time roster of the Cleveland Rebels.

 Frank Baumholtz
 Leon Brown
 Ken Corley
 Ned Endress
 Bob Faught
 Kleggie Hermsen
 Pete Lalich
 Hank Lefkowitz
 Leo Mogus
 George Nostrand
 Mel Riebe
 Irv Rothenberg
 Ed Sadowski
 Kenny Sailors
 Ben Scharnus
 Dick Schulz
 Nick Shaback
 Ray Wertis

Coaches and others
The following two coaches are the only two coaches of the Cleveland Rebels.
Roy Clifford
Dutch Dehnert

See also
List of defunct National Basketball Association teams

References

 
Rebels
Defunct National Basketball Association teams
Basketball Association of America teams
Basketball teams established in 1946
Basketball teams disestablished in 1947
1946 establishments in Ohio
1947 disestablishments in Ohio